The Dunlop Super2 Series (formerly known as Dunlop Series, Fujitsu V8 Supercars Series, HPDC V8 Supercars Series, Konica Minolta V8 Supercars Series and Konica V8 Supercars/Lites Series) is an Australian touring car racing competition, specifically the second tier series for Supercars competitors. Competing vehicles are older than those utilised in the Supercars Championship series and are usually run by smaller teams with lower budgets. The series is a critical stepping stone in driver development, the pathway to the Repco Supercars Championship and a place where young drivers can hone their skills and showcase their talent in front of the championship teams.

Events

The series was first held in 2000 as the 2000 Konica V8 Lites Series and this inaugural contest was won by Dean Canto. Towards the end of the season Stone Brothers Racing entered a car for David Besnard as preparation for the long distance races, in the main V8 Supercar series, the Queensland 500 and the Bathurst 1000, which unlike the other races require two drivers for each competing vehicle. Since then main series teams have used the series to help get their endurance co-drivers up-to-speed, or have employed drivers competing for other Fujitsu Series teams. While originally Fujitsu Series teams were allowed to enter main series events, this has since been discontinued as all main series events are limited to those teams carrying valid franchise slots for the main series, although in limited circumstances Fujitsu series teams have been able to lease entries from main series teams.

The 2007 champion, Tony D'Alberto, drove for the Tony D'Alberto Racing team, and like many of his predecessors, graduated to the V8 Supercar series in 2008, again with the family team.

From 2009 onward all Super2 Series have run on the Supercars calendar.

This series carries the colloquial title of 'Development Series' which was the name given to the series by V8 Supercar Australia between the 2004 and 2005 seasons.  The colloquial title is referred to in many conversations, even though there has never been a Development Series race because a naming rights sponsor was found before the start of the 2005 season.

Started during in the 2016 year season of the Dunlop Super2 Series (Named as Supercars Dunlop Series) Car of The Future specification cars were eligible in the series.

During in the 2021 season of the series. The Kumho Tyre V8 Touring Car Series (Later named as Kumho Tyre Super3 Series in 2019 before being named as Dunlop Super3 Series) joined alongside the Dunlop Super2 Series category for the first time as a class racing on track at the same time.

Series winners

Rookie of the Year Winners

Records (Top-5)

Note: bold text indicates active drivers and teams.

References

External links
Dunlop Super2 Series website

Supercars Championship
Supercars Development Series